Martinek or Martínek is a surname of Polish and Czech origin. Spelling variants include Martínková, Martineck and Martyniak. It may refer to:

Alexander Martinek (1919–1944), Austrian football player
Krystian Martinek (born 1948), German actor
Hana Martínková (born 1985), Czech handball player
Irena Martínková (born 1986), Czech football player
Jan Martyniak (born 1939) Polish bishop
János Martinek (born 1965), Hungarian athlete
Joe Martinek (born 1989), American football player
Lawrence Martinek (born 1948), American educator
Lisa Martinek (1972–2019), German actress
Lucie Martínková (born 1986), Czech football player
Petr Martínek (born 1972), Czech ice hockey player
Radek Martínek (born 1976), Czech ice hockey player
Robert Martinek (1889–1944), Austrian general
Rostislav Martynek (born 1982), Czech ice hockey player
Sophia Martineck (born 1981), German illustrator
Susanna Martinková (born 1946), Czech actress
Sven Martinek (born 1964), German actor
Veronika Martinek (born 1972), German tennis player

See also 
Martinac (disambiguation)
Martinec
Marcinek (disambiguation)
Marciniak

Slavic-language surnames
Polish-language surnames
Czech-language surnames
Patronymic surnames
Surnames from given names